Sani Yakubu Rodi (b. 1975 or 1981, according to conflicting reports) was the first prisoner to be executed under state-level Sharia law in Nigeria. He was hanged in a prison in Katsina State on January 3, 2002, for the 2001 fatal stabbing of a woman and her two children; however, he did not have legal representation at his trial (opting for self-defense), and had pleaded not guilty at his initial hearing, but had changed to a guilty plea at a later hearing, after which he was sentenced to death by hanging.

, Rodi's execution is the first and only execution to have taken place under sharia in Nigeria.

References

Nigerian people convicted of murder
People convicted of murder by Nigeria
21st-century executions by Nigeria
Executed Nigerian people
People executed by Nigeria by hanging
People executed for murder
2002 deaths
Year of birth missing